László Szabó (born 1965) is a Hungarian diplomat, physician, businessman and politician, who served as Hungarian Ambassador to the United States between 2017 and 2020. Prior to that, he served as CEO of the Teva Hungary Ltd. pharmaceutical manufacturing (2010–2014), then Deputy Minister of Foreign Affairs and Trade in the Third Orbán Government (2014–2017). He presented his credentials to U.S. President Donald Trump on 8 September 2017.

Career
Szabó began his career in 1993 at Eli Lilly and Company. He started working as Medical Sales Representatives for one year. Then he served as Marketing Coordinator and Product Manager for Hungary until 1997. In 1998 he worked in Wales UK as Sales Manager and became HR Associate and Team leader. Between 1999 and 2000 he was the Country Manager in New Zealand and the South-Pacific. In 2001 he served as Director for Human Resources for Central and Eastern Europe, Africa and Middle East. Before he became Senior Director for Human Resources, Global Medical, Regulatory and Patient Safety in 2008, he worked as general manager for Hungary from 2003 – 2007.

After that Szabó left Eli Lilly and Company. From 2010 – 2014 he served as CEO of the Teva Hungary Ltd. pharmaceutical manufacturing.
From June 2014 – 2017 Szabó served as Deputy Minister of Foreign Affairs and since October 2014 Trade in the Third Orbán Government.
In July 2017 he was appointed Ambassador of Hungary to the United States. Szabó hopes that the relationship between America and Hungary will improve under President Trump, thus Hungary can be more independent of Russia. With effect from 15 April 2020, the Board of Trustees of the Central European Press and Media Foundation (Kesma) has appointed László Szabó as the CEO and Chairman of the Board of Directors of Mediaworks Hungary Company Ltd.

References

External links
Kormány.hu

1965 births
Living people
Hungarian diplomats
Hungarian chief executives
20th-century Hungarian physicians
Ambassadors of Hungary to the United States
People from Debrecen